The 108th Training Command (Initial Entry Training) is a United States Army Reserve unit headquartered in Charlotte, North Carolina. At its activation, the unit was designated as the 108th Airborne Division, but in 1952 was redesignated the 108th Infantry Division. In 1956, the division was again reorganized, this time to the designation as the 108th Division (Institutional Training).  Under the U.S. Army Reserve Transformation of 2005, the 108th was reorganized to is current structure as the 108th Training Command (Initial Entry Training (IET)). The command is currently one of the largest in the Army Reserve, commanding and coordinating 9,000 soldiers.

Over its 75-year history, the 108th Division frequently has been called upon to pilot several new missions for the Army and Army Reserve. Over the years, the division has played an important role in pioneering and developing several training methods and policies still in use today.

History

Early history
The 108th Division was activated in 1946 as the 108th Airborne Division of the United States Army Reserve and was headquartered in Atlanta, Georgia. The division’s numbering followed in sequence with the 107th Infantry Division, a planned African American infantry division that had been constituted on the Army’s troop list during World War II, but was never activated.

Manning during this period was relatively small and funding for airborne training, equipment, and airlift support was minimal. In 1952, the division was reorganized into an infantry division and its headquarters was moved to its present location in Charlotte, North Carolina with all its subordinate units located in either North or South Carolina. In 1954, the division helped test a new method of rifle qualification known as "trainfire." In 1956, the division was selected to serve as a prototype for an Army Training Division. This meant reorganizing again to conduct basic and advanced individual training, should the division be called to active duty.

Units (1946–1956)
 Headquarters
 Special Troops
 Headquarters, Special Troops
 Headquarters Company, 108th Airborne Division
 108th Airborne Division Band
 Military Police Platoon, 108th Airborne Division
 Reconnaissance Platoon, 108th Airborne Division
 808th Airborne Ordnance Maintenance Company
 108th Airborne Quartermaster Company
 108th Airborne Signal Company
 485th Glider Infantry Regiment (1946–1952)
 518th Parachute Infantry Regiment
 519th Parachute Infantry Regiment (1946–1952)
 321st Infantry Regiment (1952–1956)
 323rd Infantry Regiment (1952–1956)
 108th Airborne Division Artillery 
 Headquarters & Headquarters Battery
 506th Parachute Field Artillery Battalion
 507th Parachute Field Artillery Battalion
 581st Glider Field Artillery Battalion
 582nd Glider Field Artillery Battalion
 598th Airborne Engineer Battalion 
 353d Airborne Medical Company
 651st Airborne Antiaircraft Battalion
 108th Parachute Maintenance Company

Note: In 1952 the 108th Airborne Division was reorganized and redesignated as the 108th Infantry Division. The 519th, reorganized as infantry, was reassigned to the 81st Infantry Division and the 485th, also reorganized as infantry, was reassigned to the 87th Infantry Division. Concurrently, the 321st and 323d Infantry Regiments were reassigned from the 81st to the 108th. Source: U.S. Army Center of Military History, Fort McNair, Washington, DC

Vietnam
In the 1960s, the division established its own drill sergeant school patterned after the active component school. In 1968, the 108th Division was restructured under its current brigade concept. During the Vietnam era, 108th Division soldiers during annual training were used to conduct interim training for soldiers waiting to begin basic training. In the 1980s the division developed an updated and more practical mobilization plan. During those same years the division began conducting basic training by themselves at Fort Jackson under new Mobilization Army Training Center and Provisional Training concepts.

End of the Cold War
In January 1991, more than 300 108th Division soldiers were called to active duty to support Operation Desert Storm, marking the first mobilization ever for members of the 108th Division. The soldiers assisted in the retraining of individual soldiers at Fort Jackson who were recalled up to military duty. In late 1993, the 108th Division accepted the mission to pilot a new concept in Army training called Future Army Schools Twenty-first Century. This not only expanded the geographic size of the 108th Division to add the states of Georgia and Florida, but added 10 new US Army Reserve Forces schools to the division's force structure. Those schools were later reorganized into functionally aligned school brigades.

This gave the 108th Division a new mission. While keeping its mission of conducting initial entry training for new soldiers entering the Army, it now conducts specialized skill training for thousands of soldiers, both officers and enlisted, in the southeastern part of the United States.

In 1996 the 108th Division was assigned another completely new mission to conduct Reserve Officer Training Corps training at three colleges and universities in Florida, Georgia and South Carolina. That program has been expanded nationally. In October 1998, 108th Division assumed command and control of the former 265th US Army Forces School in Puerto Rico, which added an 8th Brigade. In 2001, the ROTC structure was officially designated the division's 9th Brigade. In 2004, a reorganization of the Army Reserve resulted in the 108th Division expanding into Alabama and Mississippi.

Twenty-first century
Between 2001 and 2007 over 2,000 soldiers from the 108th have mobilized and deployed in support of the Global War on Terrorism. The 108th was in the middle of its biggest mobilization in history. Almost 1,000 soldiers from across the United States are deployed to Iraq and Kuwait to help train, maintain, and sustain Iraqi security and police forces as part of the military's exit strategy from Iraq. 

In 2008, the command was reorganized and currently has three subordinate divisions, the 95th Training Division (Initial Entry Training) based at Fort Sill, Oklahoma, the 98th Training Division (Initial Entry Training) based at Fort Benning, Georgia and the 104th Training Division (Leader Training) based at Fort Lewis, Washington. The command is currently one of the largest in the Army Reserve, it supports initial military training and ROTC (leader training). Currently the command has over 10,000 soldiers assigned throughout the United States, Guam, and Puerto Rico.

The current Commanding General of the 108th Training Command (IET) is Major General Andrew J. Juknelis.

Former Commanding Generals 
 MG Andrew J. Juknelis (February 2020 - November 2022)
 MG Kate K. Leahy (October 2018 - February 2020)
 MG Mark T. McQueen (October 2015 - October 2018)
 MG Leslie A. Purser (July 2013 – October 2015)
 MG Robert P. Stall (June 2010 – July 2013)
 MG James B. Mallory, III (March 2007 – June 2010)
 MG Charles E. McCartney Jr. (March 2003 – March 2007)
 MG H. Douglas Robertson (March 1999 – March 2003)
 MG George W. Goldsmith Jr. (March 1995 – March 1999)
 MG Ronald E. Sneed (March 1991 – March 1995)
 MG William A. Gantt Jr. (August 1987 – March 1991)
 MG Charles J. Whisnant (August 1983 – August 1987)
 MG Berlyn K. Sutton (September 1980 – August 1983)
 MG Paul S. Oliver (December 1976 – September 1980)
 MG Scott S. Ferebee (December 1969 – December 1976)
 MG Ian M. Davidson (February 1966 – December 1969)
 MG Thomas Thorne (September 1965 – February 1966)
 MG Robert M. Jones (June 1960 – June 1965)
 MG Thomas M. Mayfield (March 1952 – June 1960)

Notable soldiers of the 108th Training Command (IET)
 SFC Kenneth W. Cabe, 108th Leadership Academy, 1977 Drill Sergeant of the Year
 SFC Harold D. Cline, 108th Div., 1973 Drill Sergeant of the Year
 SGT Devin M. Crawford, 1st BDE, 95th Div., 2018 Drill Sergeant of the Year (DSOY).
 SFC Edward E. Enfinger, 108th Div., 1981 Drill Sergeant of the Year
 CSM Michael D. Schultz former USARC Command Sergeant Major.
Lieutenant General Jack C. Stultz Jr., former Chief, Army Reserve (CAR)/Commanding General, United States Army Reserve Command (USARC).

Subordinate units
 USAR Drill Sergeant School
 95th Training Division (IET)
 98th Training Division (IET)
 104th Training Division (LT)

References

108th Division History
GlobalSecurity: 108th Division

External links
Command structure
www.armyreserve.army.mil/USARC/TNG/0108TNGCMD(IET)/

1946 establishments in Georgia (U.S. state)
Military units and formations established in 1946
Infantry divisions of the United States Army
Military units and formations of the United States Army Reserve